Harmonious construction is a principle of statutory interpretation used in the Indian legal system. It holds that when two provisions of a legal text seem to conflict, they should be interpreted so that each has a separate effect and neither is redundant or nullified.

References 

Law of India